Robert Vaughn (June 4, 1885, in Stamford, New York – April 11, 1965) was a professional baseball player who played a season for the New York Highlanders of the American League and a season for the St. Louis Terriers of the Federal League.

Vaughn played college baseball at Princeton University.

References

Sources

New York Highlanders players
St. Louis Terriers players
1885 births
1965 deaths
Major League Baseball third basemen
Baseball players from New York (state)
Princeton Tigers baseball players
Minor league baseball managers
Toronto Maple Leafs (International League) players
Newark Indians players
Jersey City Skeeters players
Buffalo Bisons (minor league) players
Portland Beavers players
Los Angeles Angels (minor league) players
Vernon Tigers players
People from Stamford, New York